The Aero A.42 was a Czechoslovakian bomber aircraft of 1929 that was only ever produced in prototype form. For its day, it was an advanced design, with a sleek monoplane configuration. However, the Czechoslovak Air Force was not satisfied with it for a number of reasons. In particular, the aircraft's take-off and landing runs were felt to be excessively long, and crew complained about the cramped cabin. The air force suggested a set of modifications to Aero, including replacing the wooden wing with a metal one, but Aero discontinued development.

One prototype was used by the Czechoslovak Air Force until 1938, then by the Slovak Air Force. Probably it was scrapped in 1940.

The A.42 was a single-engined high-wing cantilever monoplane with fixed landing gear.

Specifications (A.42)

References

External links

Photos and drawings of A.42 at Ugolok Neba

1920s Czechoslovakian bomber aircraft
A042
Single-engined tractor aircraft
High-wing aircraft
Aircraft first flown in 1929